Iba, officially the Municipality of Iba,  is a 1st class municipality and capital of the province of Zambales, Philippines. According to the 2020 census, it has a population of 55,581 people.

As the capital of the province, it is second largest provincial capital in terms of land area in Central Luzon Region after Tarlac City.

Iba is the birthplace of former Philippine President Ramon Magsaysay. With a continuously growing number of commercial establishments, banks, and financial institutions in Iba, it contends among the most competitive municipalities in Philippines, and is pushing forward towards a progressive city.

Etymology
The municipality was named after the tree Phyllanthus acidus, which bears edible sour fruits. It is locally known as iba, a name which also applies to the similar kamias (Averrhoa bilimbi).

History
Iba was founded by the Order of Augustinian Recollect priests led by Fray Rodrigo de San Miguel in 1611 as the village of Paynauen. The early inhabitants of the town are called Zambals. They were later joined by the Ilocanos who migrated to the town which resulted in intermingling of customs and traditions. The Aeta people settled in the hinterlands and the majority of them dwelled in the Mount Pinatubo area. In 1860, the administration of the town was turned over to the Dominican priests until the civil government came to power. There are no available records as to when Paynauen was renamed to Iba. 

The permanent capital of Zambales was moved from Masinloc to Iba because of its strategic location being on the central part of Zambales.  On August 28, 1901, American Civil Governor William Howard Taft held the historic session of the Second Philippine Commission establishing the Province of Zambales under the American rule held at Roman Catholic Church of Iba.

Proposed conversion to a city
The League of Cities of the Philippines has disagreed with the proposed conversion of sixteen municipalities into constituent cities. The LCP had tried to influence then-President Gloria Macapagal-Arroyo to certify as call for immediate attention a draft of a law imposing a suspension on the conversion of additional towns into cities.

The Local Government Code states that before a town could be classified as a city, it must have an annual income of at least Php100 million and a land area of at minimum  or a population of 150,000.

Senator Sonny Angara advocated for House Bill 24 filed by Zamboanga Sibugay Representative Dulce Ann Hofer giving automatic cityhood to capitals of provinces without cities, and freeing the capital towns of provinces from the income needs of the cityhood.

Geography
The municipality of Iba is bounded by the municipalities of Botolan to the south, Palauig to the north, the province of Tarlac to the east, and the South China Sea to the west.  Like most of the municipalities in the province, Iba is geographically bound by the coast in the west with the Zambales Mountains in the eastern portion of the municipality.

Barangays
Iba is politically subdivided into 14 barangays.
 Amungan (partly urban)
 Bangantalinga (rural)
 Dirita-Baloguen (partly urban)
 Lipay-Dingin-Panibuatan (rural)
 Palanginan (highly urban)
 San Agustin (rural)
 Santa Barbara (rural)
 Santo Rosario (rural)
 Zone 1 Pob. (highly urban)
 Zone 2 Pob. (urban)
 Zone 3 Pob. (urban)
 Zone 4 Pob. (urban)
 Zone 5 Pob. (urban)
 Zone 6 Pob. (urban)

Climate
Iba has a tropical monsoon climate (Köppen climate classification Am). Iba's climate is no different from the other towns where rainy season begins from May and ends in October, while the dry season is from November to April.

Demographics

The population of Iba has become a mixture of different people over the last twenty years as opportunities in employment and business attracted people from Pangasinan, Bataan, and Batangas. Originally, the population was composed of the Sambal and Ilocano speaking people. While Sambal and Ilocano are spoken by many of the population, Tagalog has become the common dialect spoken in Iba.

Religion
The majority of the people in Iba, Zambales are Roman Catholics. The largest minority religion is Iglesia ni Cristo followed by various Protestant denominations.

Ecclesiastical District
The seat of the Ecclesiastical District of Zambales North of the Iglesia ni Cristo is located in Iba. The INC district administration and district office oversees several locales and extensions from different municipalities in the northern part of Zambales province.

Diocese of Iba
The Cathedral of Iba, also known as the Cathedral of Saint Augustine, is the seat of the Roman Catholic Diocese of Iba.  The church of the diocese is a 17th-century Baroque church built by the Augustinian Recollects. It is located adjacent to the Provincial Capitol Building.  Currently, the appointed bishop is Bishop Bartolome G. Santos Jr. since Bishop Florentino Lavarias became the Archbishop of San Fernando, Pampanga.

Economy 

The population of Iba increases during daytime because of traders, market buyers, students, government and private employees flocking into town. There are currently two malls in the municipality, Iba Town Center Mall - the first community mall in the town, and City Supermarket, Inc. (CSI Mall). Happy Go Shopping Center is also a major shopping destination in town, with Robinsons Place Iba and WalterMart Iba being planned. Several supermarket chains including SM Savemore Market, Robinson's Supermarket, PureGold Iba, CSI Supermarket and Ramrod Supermarket have branches in Iba. Some of the major fast food restaurants such as Jollibee, McDonald's, Greenwich, Chowking, Mang Inasal, Max's Restaurant, Andoks, Goldilocks, Red Ribbon, Cindy's, Roberto's Steak House, Shakey's Pizza and more have franchises in Iba. Metrobank, BDO, BPI, EastWest Bank, PS Bank, Landbank, PNB, RCBC, Bank of Commerce, GM Bank, Bridge Bank, Producers Bank, Cooperative Bank of Zambales and Chinabank have branches in Iba. Some national government offices can also be found in Iba, such as the SSS, NBI and PhilHealth.

Tourism
Tourism is one of the major economic activity in Iba during the summer period. It has become a popular destination for summer vacationists and tourists due to the pristine and beautiful beaches that line the shorelines of Iba, and adventure trekking to the unique 3-series of Iba waterfalls. Its pollution-free beaches due to the absence of industrial-polluting activities in the locality, make it one of the best places in the Philippines.

In response to the growing number of both local and foreign visitors, investments in beach resorts have increased in the last fifteen years. Today there are about 50 beach resorts in Iba.

Festivals

Zambales Mango Festival The festival is a celebration of a bountiful harvest of mangoes and other agricultural products which the province is known for. It is also aimed to highlight the attractions and places of interest in all of its towns.  As a way of promoting and giving thanks for a good harvest, the people of Zambales annually celebrate the six-day Mango Festival in March or April in Iba.

Paynauen Festival A summer festival in Iba featuring local traditional arts and culture first celebrated in the 1980s, Paynauen Festival (also spelled as Paynawen) has become a yearly tradition and a tourist attraction lasting for about seven days. Paynauen's festivities include street dancing, singing competition, boxing events, sports events, sand castle building, carabao race, kite flying contests, Miss Paynauen competition, cooking contest, barangay booth displays, products display and sales, ballroom dancing, traditional parade, concerts and many others.

The festival is held late April, during the summer season where thousands of visitors flock to Iba for beach activities. Led by the Iba Tourism Council, Paynauen is supported by the local government, different civic organizations, volunteers and the private business sector.

Transportation

By land Iba is easily reached from Manila and Pangasinan by land transportation.

By air The town can be also reached by small aircraft using the Iba Airport, a small feeder airport with a  runway located along the coast of Iba.

Healthcare
The provincial government administers the President Ramon Magsaysay Memorial Hospital in Bargy. Palanginan to provide convenient medical services at a lower costs to the people of the Zambales.  The hospital received a ₱50-million equipment upgrade in 2011 to better serve its patients.

The Santa Cecilia Medical Center is a private institution offering one of the most complete and advance medical facilities in the province.

Saint Pio's Medical Center is also a large medical facilities and a private institution located along Govic Road in Brgy. Dirita.

Education

Tertiary education
The President Ramon Magsaysay State University (PRMSU), formerly Ramon Magsaysay Technological University (RMTU), is a government-funded higher education institution founded in 1910. The school was merged with two other colleges in the province in 1998 to become the present multi-campus university system. Its main campus is located in the center of Iba with satellite campuses located all over the province.

The provincial office of the Technical Education and Skills Development Authority (TESDA) in Zambales is located on Magsaysay Avenue. TESDA was established by the Philippine government to manage and supervise the vocational education and skills development of the country's human resources through training and scholarships.

All Asia Aviation Academy is a flying school offering flight and ground training located in Iba Airport between Brgy. LDP and Brgy. Sto. Rosario.

Micro Asia College of Science and Technology located in Brgy. Zone 1.

Marasigan Technological College located in Brgy. Zone 1.

Hopeful Beginnings Institute located in Brgy. Palanginan.

Popular culture 
 The movie Apocalypse Now (shot in 1976; released in 1979) was about to be filmed by Francis Ford Coppola in Iba when Typhoon Olga (Didang) destroyed the sets constructed for the movie.  The sets were recreated in Pagsanjan, Laguna and the beach scenes were filmed in Baler, Aurora.

Government

References

External links

Official Website of Iba, Zambales
Iba Profile at PhilAtlas.com
[ Philippine Standard Geographic Code]
Local Governance Performance Management System - Iba,Zambales
Iba Travel Guide

 
Municipalities of Zambales
Provincial capitals of the Philippines